Vera Gönczi (born 18 October 1969) is a Hungarian alpine skier. She competed in three events at the 1992 Winter Olympics.

References

1969 births
Living people
Hungarian female alpine skiers
Olympic alpine skiers of Hungary
Alpine skiers at the 1992 Winter Olympics
Skiers from Budapest